Kalahari Resorts and Conventions is a water park resort chain with locations in Wisconsin Dells, Wisconsin; Sandusky, Ohio; Pocono Manor, Pennsylvania; and in Round Rock, Texas. Named for the Kalahari Desert in southern Africa, the resorts are heavily decorated with African animals, plants, and other African motifs.

Kalahari Resorts operates some of the largest indoor water parks in the United States. The Round Rock location's 223,000-square-foot indoor water park is the second largest in the United States, followed by the Pocono Mountains location's 220,000-square-foot water park, the 173,000-square-foot waterpark in Sandusky and the Wisconsin Dells' 125,000-square-foot park. A Fredericksburg, Virginia location was in development until 2013, when it was scrapped after problems with financing.

Conventions held at the Kalahari Resorts are typically by state and regional organizations, such as the Wisconsin Network Conference on Alzheimer's Disease and Related Dementias in May 2014, Ohio Holstein Convention in February 2020, and Wisconsin District Ladies Ministries Retreat in April 2021.

Locations

Wisconsin Dells
The Wisconsin Dells resort opened in May 2000. It has 756 guest rooms, making it the second-largest resort in the state.

It was also America's largest indoor water park until the Kalahari Resort in Sandusky finished its indoor water park expansion in December 2007. The Wisconsin Dells resort's Indoor Waterpark is home to the first indoor uphill water coaster and first indoor FlowRider surfing simulator. In 2011, the indoor waterpark went through an expansion, which included America's first indoor "Super Loops" slides. Wisconsin Dells Kalahari also has a  outdoor water park with several water slides, a lazy river, and a three-story interactive play structure.

In December 2008, the resort added a  indoor theme park.

In 2011, six-year-old Timmothy Pitzen was last seen at the Wisconsin Dells resort. His mother (who was with Pitzen at the time) was found dead in Rockford, Illinois.

Sandusky

The water park contains a FoilTec roof system that lets in natural light.

With 884 guest rooms, the hotel is the largest in the state of Ohio.

On March 12, 2018, a section of HVAC ductwork fell from the ceiling of the indoor waterpark, injuring five people.

In 2019 and 2020, the resort made some minor updates to the property. A new outdoor mini-golf course was constructed, the Zip Coaster roller coaster-water slide hybrid was torn down, and the water basketball area was closed and replaced with underwater virtual reality.

Pocono Mountains
The Pocono Mountains, Pennsylvania, location opened on July 1, 2015, and completed an expansion in March 2017. It consists of a  indoor waterpark, an outdoor waterpark,  convention center, 977 guest rooms, and a  arcade and entertainment center.

Round Rock
The Round Rock, Texas location opened on November 12, 2020. It consists of a  indoor waterpark (the second largest in the country), outdoor water park, 3 acres of outdoor pools, a 975-room hotel, five restaurants, 10,000 square feet of retail space and a 200,000 square-foot convention center. It is the first location to be in a metropolitan area instead of a resort town because the manager stated that "Round Rock has been one of the fastest-growing cities in the country and we took notice of that and as we started to look at our next development, it made sense we go south and what better place than the great state of Texas". On March 21, 2022, an EF2 tornado passed by, leaving no major structural damage at the resort.

References

External links
Kalahari Resorts Website

Indoor amusement parks
Animal theme parks
Water parks in Ohio
Water parks in Wisconsin
Water parks in Pennsylvania
Water parks in Texas
Zoos in Ohio
Buildings and structures in Sandusky, Ohio
Wisconsin Dells, Wisconsin
Tourist attractions in Erie County, Ohio
2000 establishments in Wisconsin
2005 establishments in Ohio
2015 establishments in Pennsylvania
2020 establishments in Texas
Amusement parks opened in 2000

sah:Kalahari Resorts